Svenska Cupen 1945 was the fifth season of the main Swedish football Cup. The competition was concluded on 26 August 1945 with the Final, held at Råsunda Stadium, Solna in Stockholms län. IFK Norrköping won 4-1 against Malmö FF before an attendance of 31,896 spectators.

Preliminary round 1
For results see SFS-Bolletinen - Matcher i Svenska Cupen.

Preliminary round 2

For other results see SFS-Bolletinen - Matcher i Svenska Cupen.

First round

For other results see SFS-Bolletinen - Matcher i Svenska Cupen.

Second round
The 8 matches in this round were played on 8 July 1945.

Quarter-finals
The 4 matches in this round were played on 15 July 1945.

Semi-finals
The semi-finals in this round were played on 22 July 1945.

Final
The final was played on 26 August 1945 at the Råsunda Stadium.

Footnotes

References 

1945
Cup
Sweden